Annalee Yassi is a Canadian health scholar, currently a Canada Research Chair in Global Health and Capacity Building at University of British Columbia.

References

Year of birth missing (living people)
Living people
Academic staff of the University of British Columbia
Canadian medical researchers